The Fujian People's Government (also spelled as the Fukien People's Government), officially the People's Revolutionary Government of the Republic of China , was a short-lived anti-Kuomintang government that established a communist state in the Chinese Republic's Fujian Province.  The rebellion that led to its formation and its collapse are known as the Fujian Incident ( or ) or Fujian Rebellion.

Background 

In November 1933 some leaders of the National Revolutionary Army's 19th Route Army—including Cai Tingkai, Chen Mingshu and Jiang Guangnai, who had gained fame for their role in the January 28 Incident—were deployed to southern China to suppress a Communist rebellion. Instead, they negotiated peace with the rebels. In alliance with other Kuomintang forces under Li Jishen, the 19th Route leaders broke with Chiang Kai-shek and took control of Fujian, where they were stationed, and on 22 November 1933, proclaimed a new government.  The chairman of the government was Li Jishen, Eugene Chen was foreign minister, Jiang Guangnai was finance minister and Cai Tingkai was military head and governor of Fujian Province.

The flag was red, symbolizing the proletariat, and blue, symbolizing the peasants, with a yellow star in the middle symbolizing the glorious unity of the productive people.  The name of the new state was the "Republic of China" (Zhōnghuá Gònghéguó, 中華共和國, distinct from the Republic of China named Zhōnghuá Mínguó, 中華民國), with its founding being year one.  The 19th Route Army was renamed the People's Revolutionary Army (人民革命軍).

Chen Mingshu led the newly created Productive People's Party, while it had support from the "Third Party".  The Chinese Youth Party considered supporting them, but were put off by their leftism and lack of realistic sustainability.  The rebellion initially enjoyed popular support among most Fujianese, but high taxes to support the army decreased its popularity.  In addition, the new government's decision to break continuity by issuing a new flag, new symbols and occasionally removing the portrait of the revered leader Sun Yat-sen caused hesitation in many quarters.  After adopting a wait-and-see approach, the New Guangxi clique declined to support the rebels. Feng Yuxiang was widely expected to be supportive, but he remained silent.  Chen Jitang and Hu Hanmin were sympathetic to their goals, but condemned them for dividing the country.  The fear of a new civil war at a time of Japanese aggression was the main reason why the rebellion had very little popularity.

The rebels were motivated by, among other things, personal disagreements with Chiang Kai-shek, opposition to perceived appeasement of Japan and their assignment to the then relatively poor Fujian. The goals of the new government included the overthrow of the Kuomintang government in Nanjing, various social and political reforms and stronger resistance to foreign interference in China. The rebellion brought a temporary halt to the central government's Fifth Encirclement Campaign in southeast China.  However, implied or promised aid to the rebellion from the Communist Party's Jiangxi Soviet failed to materialize due to opposition by the 28 Bolsheviks and the effort began to collapse.

The Kuomintang responded to the rebellion first with air attacks and, in January 1934, a ground offensive that quickly led to the defeat of the formerly prestigious 19th Route Army.  On 13 January 1934, the government was defeated and its leaders fled or defected to Chiang Kai-shek's forces.

Notes

References 

 William F. Dorrill. The Fukien Rebellion and the CCP: A Case of Maoist Revisionism The China Quarterly, No. 37. (Jan. - Mar., 1969), pp. 31–53. 
 Frederick S. Litten. "The CCP and the Fujian Rebellion." Republican China, vol. XIV, number 1, November 1988, pp. 57–74. Accessed 20 February 2007.

History of Fujian
1933 establishments in China
1934 disestablishments in China
Former countries in Chinese history
States and territories established in 1933
Former socialist republics